The 2022–23 Monmouth Hawks men's basketball team represents Monmouth University in the 2022–23 NCAA Division I men's basketball season. The Hawks, led by 12th-year head coach King Rice, play their home games at OceanFirst Bank Center in West Long Branch, New Jersey, as first-year members of the Colonial Athletic Association.

Previous season
The Hawks finished the 2021–22 season 21–13, 11–9 in MAAC play to finish in fourth place. In the MAAC tournament, they defeated Niagara and Rider, before falling to Saint Peter's in the championship game. This was the team's final season as a member of the Metro Atlantic Athletic Conference, as they moved to the Colonial Athletic Association, starting in the 2022–23 season.

Roster

Schedule and results

|-
!colspan=12 style=| Non-conference regular season

|-
!colspan=12 style=| CAA regular season

|-
!colspan=9 style=""| CAA tournament

Sources

References

Monmouth Hawks men's basketball seasons
Monmouth Hawks
Monmouth Hawks men's basketball
Monmouth Hawks men's basketball